Sidney Ferris Rosenberg (born April19, 1967) is an American radio personality. He is currently the host of Sid and Friends in the Morning and "Sid Sports Sunday" plus sports reporter on 77 WABC in New York City.

Career
Rosenberg is known for his controversial and sarcastic humor as a host on many radio stations including, WAXY "790 The Ticket"  in Miami, where he hosted his own morning show. He originally was paired with O.J. McDuffie, formerly a wide receiver with the Miami Dolphins; McDuffie resigned his position with the station in the summer of 2006.

Rosenberg's jokingly self-given middle name "Arthur" is a reference to former baseball player Dave Kingman. When Hall of Fame sportscaster Bob Murphy gave the lineups for the New York Mets, he would always give Kingman's name as "David Arthur Kingman"; Rosenberg continues this running gag on the Sports Guys by using Arthur as everybody's middle name.

Early career
His radio career started in West Palm Beach, Florida, where he hosted the syndicated sports radio program The Drive on Sports Fan Radio Network in the late 1990s, after starting as an Internet broadcast. In 2000, he returned to New York City to co-host WNEW-FM's turbulent morning show, the Sports Guys. A year later, he joined the Imus in the Morning program. He shared the sports broadcasting duties with Warner Wolf before becoming the full-time sports reporter. He engaged in heated half-mock, half-serious disputes with the other members of the Imus cast, leading for example to an actual boxing bout with producer Bernard McGuirk. Several months after joining the Imus show, he became the co-host of the midday show on Imus' flagship station, WFAN. Here, his strong knowledge of sports and distinctive, high-pitched Brooklyn accent served him well. He would hold both broadcasting positions until 2005. For several years, he also hosted the radio pre-game shows for New York Giants home games.

WFAN executives accepted Rosenberg's resignation September12, 2005, following his failure to show up to host the New York Giants' pre-game show having made an appearance for FHM in Atlantic City, New Jersey the previous day.

Inflammatory television commentary
Rosenberg was no stranger to controversy on the Imus show, which was also simulcast on MSNBC cable television. Among other things, he said on-air that Venus Williams was an "animal," and that she and Serena Williams would be better suited for National Geographic magazine than for Playboy, that "faggots play tennis" and that the United States women's national soccer team were "a bunch of juiced up dykes."

Rosenberg was fired from the Imus show after making crude remarks about Australian singer Kylie Minogue's breast cancer diagnosis. Chris Carlin replaced Rosenberg, although Rosenberg continued to call into the Imus program. As a substitute sportscaster on April4, 2007, Rosenberg reported on Rutgers University's 59-46 loss the previous evening to the University of Tennessee, in the final game of the NCAA Women's Division I Basketball Championship. This served as a lead-in to Imus and other cast members, who made comments that resulted in the cancelation of the program one week later.

Radio broadcasting 2005–present

Southern Florida
Rosenberg began working at Miami-based WAXY 790-The Ticket in November 2005. Rosenberg and the station parted ways in March 2009.

In September 2009, he joined South Florida radio station WQAM. He was fired in April 2012 following a DUI arrest. and was replaced by Dan Sileo.

Rosenberg returned to the airwaves at WMEN 640AM on August13, 2012. He was released by WMEN in December 2015 in what he called a cost-cutting move.

New York City
Rosenberg returned to WFAN on Saturday, February6, 2010 to host a special Super Bowl preview show from Miami. On Saturday, March27, 2010 Rosenberg again returned to WFAN hosting a show in Port St. Lucie before the New York Mets faced the Washington Nationals. He also completed two weeks of fill-in work with Kimberly Jones, Marc Malusis and Anita Marks on WFAN in July 2010 from 10:00a.m. to 1:00p.m. for Joe Benigno and Evan Roberts, who themselves were filling in for Mike Francesa from 1:00 to 6:30p.m. WFAN's Mark Chernoff told Newsday of Long Island's Neil Best that he was very impressed with Sid's return to the FAN, but that there was very little he could do to make the temporary hosting in New York anything more than temporary.

In 2011, Rosenberg became the weekday morning sports anchor for WFAN's sister station, 1010 WINS. He left WINS in 2012.

In 2012, Craig Carton welcomed Rosenberg back, who CBS had neglected to invite to WFAN's 25th Anniversary celebration.

In 2015, it was reported that Rosenberg would be filling in for Geraldo Rivera in August on 77 WABC.

On January27, 2016, Rosenberg officially returned to New York radio as co-host of The Bernie and Sid Show of 77 WABC with Bernard McGuirk.

On November4, 2016, it was announced that Rosenberg was replacing Warner Wolf as the Imus in the Morning sports contributor.

On March8, 2018 Rosenberg and Bernard McGuirk signed contracts to replace the retiring Don Imus of the Imus in the Morning show.

On December2, 2022, following Bernard McGuire's death, "Bernie and Sid in the Morning" became known as "Sid and Friends in the Morning".

Personal life
He and his wife Danielle were married in 1992 and have two children. Rosenberg, who is a cousin of former Minnesota senator Norm Coleman, attended the University of Miami and Brooklyn College in 1984 and 1985 but dropped out of both.  Rosenberg then obtained an associates degree from Kingsborough Community College in 1990 followed by a BA in Business from Baruch College in the Flatiron/Gramercy section of Manhattan in 1992.

References

External links
 Official website
 

Living people
1967 births
People from Brooklyn
American male journalists
American sports radio personalities
Journalists from New York City
Brooklyn College alumni